The Bandai RX-78 is a Japanese 8-bit microcomputer manufactured by Bandai.  Its name comes from the RX-78-2 Gundam.  It was released in July 1983, and employed a SHARP LH0080A (Zilog Z80A clone) CPU. It ran at a clock speed of 4.1 MHz, and shipped with 30 KB of RAM and 8KB of ROM. It had two joystick ports in a proprietary format using 8-pin DIN connectors. 

The computer can generate 27 colors, created from 3 levels of intensity of  each RGB channel, arranged into VRAM video planes, with a maximum resolution of 192×184 pixels, and is capable of displaying 30 x 23 text characters using a 6x8 pixel font. Sound was generated by the Texas Instruments SN76489 chip, providing 3 voices in four octaves and noise generator. Software was available on cartridges or cassettes.

The RX-78 had a release cost of 59,800 yen, and was sold with a dozen of games and software, including a BASIC interpreter cartridge featuring a cassette tape interface .

Games
The Bandai RX-78 was primarily a gaming machine, with two joysticks included. Software was released on ROM cartridges ("Sen'you Soft Cartridge") and compact cassettes ("Sen'you Tape Cassette").

20 games for the Bandai RX-78 were released, along with a smaller number of non-gaming titles.

Cannon Ball (Sen'you Soft Cartridge)
Card World (Sen'you Soft Cartridge)
Challenge Golf (Sen'you Soft Cartridge)
Champion Racer (Sen'you Soft Cartridge)
Donjara (Sen'you Tape Cassette)
Excite Baseball (Sen'you Soft Cartridge)
Excite Tennis (Sen'you Soft Cartridge)
Hamburger Shop (Sen'you Soft Cartridge)
Hitsuji Yaai (Sen'you Tape Cassette)
Mobile Suit Gundam: Luna Two no Tatakai (Sen'you Soft Cartridge)
Perfect Mah-jongg (Sen'you Soft Cartridge)
The Pro-Wrestling (Sen'you Soft Cartridge)
Rengo Kantai (Sen'you Soft Cartridge)
Sekigahara (Sen'you Soft Cartridge)
Space Capsule (Sen'you Tape Cassette)
Space Enemy (Sen'you Soft Cartridge)
Super Motocross (Sen'you Soft Cartridge)
Tatakae! Ultraman (Sen'you Soft Cartridge)
Yellow Cab (Sen'you Tape Cassette)
Zerosen (Sen'you Soft Cartridge)

Educational (Education Series)
ABC Tangou Game (Sen'you Soft Cartridge)
Graphic Sugaku (Sen'you Tape Cassette)
Keisan Enshuu Drill (Sen'you Tape Cassette)
Sansu Tsuma Zuki

Applications (Culture Series)
3-Dimension Graphics (Sen'you Soft Cartridge)
Animation Graphics (Sen'you Soft Cartridge)
BS BASIC Ver.1.0 (Sen'you Soft Cartridge)
Creative Graphics (Sen'you Soft Cartridge)
Healthy Life Plan (Sen'you Tape Cassette)
Kanji Word Processor
Music Master (Sen'you Soft Cartridge)
Z80 Assembler

References

External links
Old Computers Museum
1000BiT 
K's Dee Computer Museum 
Game Nostalgia RX-78 Software  
Muuseo 
Akiba PC Hotline 
Famikom no Neta!! 

Bandai consoles
Computer-related introductions in 1983
Z80-based home computers